The Minister for the Economy is a member of the Cabinet in the Welsh Government. The current officeholder is Vaughan Gething MS.

The position was titled Minister for the Economy and Transport from 2007 to 2011. The Minister had responsibility for the Department for the Economy and Transport, which combined two devolved functions of the Welsh Government: Business and Economy, and Transport. The department was created in June 2007, as successor to the Department for Enterprise Innovation and Networks, following the National Assembly for Wales elections in May 2007.

Deputy First Minister Ieuan Wyn Jones AM was appointed to the post in July 2007, succeeding Dr Brian Gibbons AM, who had been Minister since the previous month, and held the position until 13 May 2011. The role was renamed Minister for Business, Enterprise, Technology and Science during Edwina Hart's tenure in office from 2011 to 2016. The post adopted the previous title of Economy Minister under Hart's successor, Ken Skates.

Ministers

Responsibilities

Following the "yes" vote in the Welsh referendum of 1997, certain Westminster government executive and legislative powers were devolved to the National Assembly for Wales by the Government of Wales Act 1998. This included the power to determine how their budgets are spent and administered. These powers were increased by the Government of Wales Act 2006. Among those powers are Business and Economy, and Transport, for which the Minister for the Economy and Transport had responsibility within the Welsh Assembly Government.

The department's funding was allocated by the Welsh Assembly Government, following agreement of its annual budget.

The Department for Economy and Transport's stated objectives were to:

 create jobs across Wales
 stimulate enterprise and growth
 enhance skills for jobs

Business and economy

The Minister was responsible for supporting businesses in Wales, including growth and development, inward investment, provision of premises, commercial and industrial environmental improvements, and exports.

Policy for the allocation of European Union Structural Funds in Wales, and its administration, was in the remit of the Minister.

Transport

The Minister was responsible for transport policy in specific areas. The Minister's main priorities were: development of an integrated transport system in Wales; construction, improvement and maintenance of trunk roads and motorways in Wales; Transport for Wales passenger rail services; road safety strategies including speed limits, pedestrian crossings and on-street parking. The Minister also oversaw the provision of other public transport services, such as buses.

The Department
Following the National Assembly for Wales elections on 3 May 2007, the Welsh Assembly Government restructured its departments. The former Department for Enterprise Innovation and Networks was absorbed into the new Department for the Economy and Transport on 1 June 2007. Dr Brian Gibbons was appointed to the post of Minister for the Economy and Transport on its creation.

A coalition government was formed by the Labour Party and Plaid Cymru on 7 July 2007. The resulting reshuffle of the Cabinet was announced on 19 July 2007, which saw Ieuan Wyn Jones AM (Member of the National Assembly for Wales for Ynys Môn) appointed to the posts of Deputy First Minister for Wales and Minister for the Economy and Transport.

James Price, as acting Director General, Economy and Transport was the senior civil servant responsible for the department.

After the 2011 Welsh general election, the department was abolished and replaced with the department of Business, Enterprise and Technology.

See also

Conservative Party
Labour Party
Ministry
Plaid Cymru
Welsh Conservative Party
Welsh Labour

References

 
Politics of Wales
Government of Wales
Economy of Wales
Transport in Wales